The Muskoka Queer Film Festival is an annual LGBTQ film festival, staged in the Muskoka Region of the Canadian province of Ontario.

The festival was staged for the first time in 2020, by a partnership between the Muskoka Pride committee and local film production firm Sanctuary Studios. Due to the COVID-19 pandemic in Canada, its planned physical screenings were cancelled, and the event instead launched as an online festival. The second event in 2021 was again screened online. The third event in 2022 was also screened online.  All events were conducted on a pay what you can model.

Awards

2020
Audience Choice Award: Ayaneh, Nicolas Greinacher
Festival Favourite Jury Award: So Beautiful, Brandon Nicoletti

2021
Audience Choice Award: Christian in the Closet, Joel Fleming
Festival Favourite Jury Award: Sunday, Arun Fulara

2022 

 Audience Choice Award: Emergence: Out of the Shadows, Vinay Giridhar
 Festival Favourite Jury Award: Before the Eruption, Roberto Perez Toledo

References

External links

Film festivals in Ontario
Film festivals established in 2020
2020 establishments in Ontario
LGBT film festivals in Canada
Bracebridge, Ontario
Huntsville, Ontario